This article shows the rosters of all participating teams at the men's handball tournament at the 2012 Summer Olympics in London.

Group A

The following is the Argentina roster in the men's handball tournament of the 2012 Summer Olympics.

Head coaches: Eduardo Gallardo

The following is the France roster in the men's handball tournament of the 2012 Summer Olympics.

Head coaches: Claude Onesta

The following is the Great Britain roster in the men's handball tournament of the 2012 Summer Olympics.

Head coaches: Dragan Đukić

The following is the Iceland roster in the men's handball tournament of the 2012 Summer Olympics.

Head coaches: Guðmundur Guðmundsson

The following is the Swedish roster in the men's handball tournament of the 2012 Summer Olympics.

Head coaches: Staffan Olsson and Ola Lindgren

The following is the Tunisia roster in the men's handball tournament of the 2012 Summer Olympics.

Head coaches: Alain Portes

Group B

The following is the Croatia roster in the men's handball tournament of the 2012 Summer Olympics.

Head coaches: Slavko Goluža

The following is the Denmark roster in the men's handball tournament of the 2012 Summer Olympics.

Head coaches: Ulrik Wilbek

The following is the Hungary roster in the men's handball tournament of the 2012 Summer Olympics.

Head coaches: Lajos Mocsai

The following is the Serbia roster in the men's handball tournament of the 2012 Summer Olympics.

Head coaches: Veselin Vuković

The following is the South Korea roster in the men's handball tournament of the 2012 Summer Olympics.

Head coaches: Cho Young-shin

The following is the Spain roster in the men's handball tournament of the 2012 Summer Olympics.

Head coaches: Valero Rivera

See also
Handball at the 2012 Summer Olympics – Women's team rosters

References

External links
Official website

Men's team rosters
2012